On February 8, 2000, a Zlin 242L light aircraft piloted by Chicago radio personality Bob Collins was involved in a mid-air collision with a Cessna 172P over Zion, Illinois, while both aircraft were on approach to land at the nearby Waukegan National Airport. The Zlin dived and crashed through the roof of a five-story medical building. The Cessna spiraled down and crashed onto a residential street three blocks away. All three people on board both aircraft were killed and five people on the ground were injured.
 
The crash was instrumental in effecting changes at Waukegan National Airport, and on March 24, 2000, the Federal Aviation Administration (FAA) announced that the control tower would receive a Terminal Automated Radar Display and Information System.

Zlin aircraft and crew 
The Zlin 242L is a low wing two seat acrobatic aircraft. The accident aircraft, serial number 0695 and registered N5ZA, was co-owned and operated by Chicago radio disc jockey Bob Collins and Daniel Bitton and was issued its Federal Aviation Administration (FAA) Certificate on February 4, 1999. At its last annual inspection on November 3, 1999 the total airframe time was 96.4 hours, and the recording tachometer read 38.3 hours.

Collins was 57 years old; held a valid private pilot certificate; and had accumulated 1,200 total flight hours.

Cessna aircraft and crew 
The Cessna 172P is a high wing four seat civil utility aircraft. The accident aircraft was registered N99063; its FAA Certificate issue date was August 31, 1988 and the aircraft passed a 100-hour inspection on 10 January 2000 when it had a total airframe time of 12,099.6 hours.

Sharon Hock, a 31-year-old student pilot, made her first solo flight on 14 January 2000 and had accumulated a total of 36 flight hours with one hour as PIC, all in Cessna 172s.

Collision 
Both aircraft were operating under Federal Aviation Regulation Part 91 without flight plans during visual flight rules (VFR) conditions.

N5ZA's cross-country flight departed Sheboygan County Memorial Airport on February 8, 2000 at 14:00 en route to Waukegan National Airport 93 miles to the south. Collins was operating the aircraft from the left seat as pilot in command (PIC) and his pilot-rated friend Herman Luscher occupied the right seat.

Sharon Hock was flying N99063 solo and was practicing her take-offs and landings at Waukegan National Airport using runway 23 in a right hand traffic pattern. At 14:57 Hock was preparing to take-off for what would have been her twelfth and final circuit. She then was to pick up her instructor Scott Chomicz and fly back to Chicago Executive Airport, then named Palwaukee, where the airplane was based.

At 14:57:42, Hock was holding her Cessna short of runway 23 waiting for departure clearance and the Zlin was approximately 11 miles from the approach end of the runway. Veteran air traffic controller Greg Fowler was on duty in the airport's control tower as the Local Controller.

 

At this point the Local Controller lost sight of N99063 about 1.5 miles northeast of the airport and could not yet see N5ZA due to hazy weather conditions near Lake Michigan.

N99063 turned to base leg and shortly afterward turned on to final just in front of N5ZA. It is likely that, because her Cessna was below the Zlin, its high wing blocked Hock's view of the Zlin's position. When interviewed by the National Transportation Safety Board (NTSB) later, the Local Controller stated that his timing to request N99063 to turn was based on his estimate of the elapsed time between losing sight of N99063 and Collins' radio report that N5ZA had crossed the shoreline.

At this point another Cessna 172P, tail number N52048, was on the downwind leg of the left traffic pattern for runway 23 and reported seeing N99063.

The Local Controller believed the landing sequence was N5ZA first, followed by N99063 and finally N52048 but later stated at this point, "something started to click [that] something was wrong", and he used binoculars to try to spot the aircraft. The LC stated that he saw N5ZA at this time but that he did not see N99063.

 

When Collins reported "we have the traffic in sight" he had spotted the Cessna N52048 off to his left. It is likely that, because he was above Hock's aircraft, he never saw N99063 due to the blind spot created by the Zlin's right wing.

At 15:04 the Zlin and Cessna 172P N99063 collided approximately 650 feet above ground level (AGL), 2 miles from the approach end of runway 23 while both aircraft were on final approach.

At the time of impact the Zlin's airspeed was significantly higher; it struck the Cessna from above with its propeller chopping off most of the Cessna's left flap and its right wing striking the Cessna's tail. Immediately after the collision the Cessna began spiraling down; clipping a tree it initially hit the ground in a nursing home parking lot, hit two parked cars and skidded to rest in the middle of Elim Avenue. The Zlin continued level flight for a moment then nose dived into the roof of a hospital creating a hole of approximately 45 square feet. Leaking fuel exploded 45 seconds later, blowing out windows and starting an extensive fire on the fifth floor of the hospital. Five hospital employees were injured and later the hospital's insurance carrier claimed $32 million in damage.

Investigation 
The NTSB released its report on May 3, 2001. The NTSB investigation determined that the probable cause of the accident was "the pilot's [Collins] failure to maintain clearance from the other airplane. Factors relating to the accident were the pilot's poor visual lookout, and the airport control tower local controller's failure to provide effective sequencing." The NTSB did not fault Sharon Hock.

In a letter to the FAA the NTSB stated “Because [the local controller Fowler] did not see the airplanes, his erroneous estimate of [Hock’s] progress since losing visual contact and the pilots’ imprecise position reports were the only information that he had with which to judge the proper sequence of the airplanes. His initial decision to sequence [Collins] first was apparently based on his incorrect belief that [Collins] was closer to the airport than he actually was. Subsequent communications between [Fowler] and [Collins] confirm that the airplane was not nearing the runway as quickly as the sequencing plan would require; however, [Fowler] did not amend the sequence.”

The NTSB also said that the crash could have been prevented if a radar display system had been in place at Waukegan National Airport. With no radar the Local Controller could only rely on what he could see from the control tower and what information he gathered in radio communications with the pilots to provide proper sequencing.

See also 
List of accidents and incidents involving general aviation
List of notable mid-air collisions

References

Aviation accidents and incidents in 2000
Mid-air collisions
Mid-air collisions involving general aviation aircraft
Aviation accidents and incidents caused by air traffic controller error
Aviation accidents and incidents caused by pilot error